Ivan the Terrible (Italian:Ivan, il terribile) is a 1917 Italian historical film directed by Enrico Guazzoni and starring Lina Dax, Matilde Di Marzio and Angelo Gallina. It portrays the life of the Russian tsar Ivan the Terrible.

Cast
 Lina Dax
 Matilde Di Marzio 
 Angelo Gallina
 Andrea Habay 
 Amleto Novelli

References

Bibliography
 Redi, Riccardo. Cinema muto italiano: 1896-1930. Fondazione Scuola nazionale di cinema, 1999.

External links 
 

1917 films
1910s historical films
Cultural depictions of Ivan the Terrible
Italian historical films
Italian silent feature films
1910s Italian-language films
Films set in Russia
Films set in the 16th century
Films directed by Enrico Guazzoni
Italian black-and-white films